IK Tigrene was an ice hockey team in Oslo, Norway.

History
The club first participated in the 1. divisjon, the top level of Norwegian ice hockey, in the 1951-52 season. They won the league and were Norwegian champions in 1956-57 and 1960-61. The club merged with IF Frisk for the 1969-70 season.

References

 

Defunct ice hockey teams in Norway
Sport in Oslo
Sports clubs disestablished in 1969
1969 disestablishments in Norway